Carel Pietersz. Fabritius (bapt. 27 February 1622 – 12 October 1654) was a Dutch painter. He was a pupil of Rembrandt and worked in his studio in Amsterdam. Fabritius, who was a member of the Delft School, developed his own artistic style and experimented with perspective and lighting. Among his works are A View of Delft (1652; National Gallery, London), The Goldfinch (1654), and The Sentry (1654).

Biography
Carel Pietersz. Fabritius was born in February 1622 in Middenbeemster, a village in the ten-year-old Beemster polder in the Dutch Republic, and was baptized on 27 February of that year. He was the son of Pieter Carelsz., a painter and schoolteacher, and he had two younger brothers, Barent and Johannes, who also became painters.

Initially he worked as a carpenter (Latin: fabritius). In the early 1640s he studied at Rembrandt's studio in Amsterdam, along with his brother Barent. In the early 1650s he moved to Delft, and joined the Delft painters' guild in 1652.

Fabritius died young, caught in the explosion of the Delft gunpowder magazine on 12 October 1654, which destroyed a quarter of the city, along with his studio and many of his paintings. Only about a dozen paintings have survived. According to Houbraken, his student Mattias Spoors and the church deacon Simon Decker died with him, since they were working on a painting together at the time.

In a poem written by Arnold Bon to his memory, he is called Karel Faber.

Painting 
Of all Rembrandt's pupils, Fabritius was the only one to develop his own artistic style. A typical Rembrandt portrait would have a plain dark background with the subject defined by spotlighting. In contrast, Fabritius' portraits feature delicately lit subjects against light-coloured, textured backgrounds. Moving away from the Renaissance focus on iconography, Fabritius became interested in the technical aspects of painting. He used cool colour harmonies to create shape in a  luminous style of painting.

Fabritius was also interested in complex spatial effects, as can be seen in the exaggerated perspective of A View of Delft, with a Musical Instrument Seller's Stall (1652). He also showed excellent control of a heavily loaded brush, as in The Goldfinch (1654). All these qualities appear in the work of Vermeer and de Hooch, both also based in Delft; it is likely that Fabritius was a strong influence on them.

List of works
 ca. 1640 The Beheading of John the Baptist, oil on canvas, 149 x 121 cm, Rijksmuseum Amsterdam
 1643 The Raising of Lazarus, oil on canvas, National Museum, Warsaw
 1643 The Raising of Lazarus, oil on canvas, Pushkin Museum, Moscow     
 1643/45 Hagar and the Angel, oil on canvas, 157.5 x 136 cm,   The Leiden Collection New York
 c. 1644 Portrait of a Seated Woman with a Handkerchief, Art Gallery of Ontario, Toronto
 c. 1645 Self-portrait, oil on panel, 65 x 49 cm, Museum Boijmans Van Beuningen, Rotterdam
 1645–47  Mercury and Aglauros oil on canvas, 72.4 x 91.1 cm, Museum of Fine Arts Boston
 1646–1651 A Girl with a Broom, oil on canvas, 107.3 x 91.4 cm, signed as Rembrandt, National Gallery of Art, Washington D.C
 1649 Portrait of Abraham de Potter, oil on canvas, 68.5 x 57 cm, Rijksmuseum, Amsterdam
 1652 A View of Delft, with a Musical Instrument Seller's Stall, oil on canvas on panel, 15.4 x 31.6 cm, National Gallery London
 1654 The Goldfinch, oil on panel, Mauritshuis The Hague
 1654 The Sentry, oil on canvas, 68 x 58 cm, Staatliches Museum Schwerin Schwerin
 1654 Young Man in a Fur Cap, oil on canvas, 70.5 x 61.5 cm, National Gallery London (probably a self-portrait)

Notes

References
Carel Fabritius 1622–1654. Het complete oeuvre Frederik J. Duparc, Ariane van Suchtelen, Gero Seelig. 
The Oxford Dictionary of Art 
Biography at Residenzgalerie Salzburg
Olga's Gallery
Adventure's in Cybersound interest in unusual perspectives.

External links

Carel Fabritius at Artcyclopedia
Works and literature on Carel Fabritius
Vermeer and The Delft School, a full text exhibition catalog from The Metropolitan Museum of Art, which includes material on Carel Fabritius

1622 births
1654 deaths
Dutch Golden Age painters
Dutch Calvinist and Reformed Christians
Dutch male painters
Painters from Delft
People from Beemster
Pupils of Rembrandt
Deaths from explosion